The Cathedral Church of the Holy Great-Martyr George is the seat of the Serbian Orthodox Eparchy of Bačka, located in Novi Sad, northern Serbia. The present-day church was completed in 1905, on the ruins of a church built in 1734 and destroyed in 1849. It is located next to the Eparchy offices in the Bishop's Palace, in Nikola Pašić Street. It is commonly known as Saborna crkva ('Cathedral Church') among the city residents.

History

An older church in the baroque style began building in 1720, and extended in 1734, during the time of Empress Maria Theresia, Patriarch Arsenije IV Jovanović and Archpriest Visarion Pavlović. It was burnt down in a bombing in 1849, during the Revolutions in the Habsburg areas. The planning of the present-day church began in 1851, and it was built between 1860 and 1880 on the ruins of the old one, with further renovations and completion by 1905 under design by architect Milan Michal Harminc, during the office of Mitrofan Šević. A new tower with new bells from Budapest was added during the rebuilding.

Features
The cathedral is dedicated to Saint George. The church interior includes an iconostasis with 33 icons, historical pictures above both choirs, as well as two large throne icons, painted by renowned academic Paja Jovanović, which are considered to be his best ecclesiastical works. The wall paintings were made by Stevan Aleksić. It is one of the foremost monuments of the religious architecture in Novi Sad.

See also

 Religion in Vojvodina

References

Sources

Serbian Orthodox cathedrals in Serbia
Churches in Novi Sad
Churches completed in 1905
20th-century Serbian Orthodox church buildings
1905 establishments in Austria-Hungary
Cultural Monuments of Great Importance (Serbia)